Lasiodiplodia theobromae is a plant pathogen with a very wide host range. It causes rotting and dieback in most species it infects. It is a common post harvest fungus disease of citrus known as stem-end rot. It is a cause of bot canker of grapevine. It also infects Biancaea sappan, a species of flowering tree also known as Sappanwood.

On rare occasions it has been found to cause fungal keratitis, lesions on nail and subcutaneous tissue.

It has been implicated in the widespread mortality of baobab (Adansonia digitata) trees in Southern Africa. A preliminary study found the deaths to have a complex set of causes requiring detailed research.

Host and symptoms

L. theobromae causes diseases such as dieback, blights, and root rot in a variety of different hosts in tropical and subtropical regions. These include guava, coconut, papaya, and grapevine. Botryosphaeria dieback, which is formerly known as bot canker, is characterised by a range of symptoms that affect grapevine in particular. These symptoms affect different areas on the plant and can be used to diagnose this disease along with other factors. In the trunk and cordon of the plant symptoms include cankers coming out of the wounds, wedge shaped lesions when cut in cross sections and dieback. Dieback is characterized as a ‘dead arm’ and a loss of spur positions. More symptoms include stunted shoots in the spring, delay or lack of growth in the spur positions of the bud burst, bleached canes and necrotic buds. Bud necrosis, bud failure, and the dieback of arms are all a result of the necrosis of the hosts vascular system.

It can also affect the fruit of durians such as Durio graveolens.

Disease cycle
The fungus over-winters as pycnidia on the outside of diseased wood. The pycnidia produces and releases two-celled, dark brown, striated conidia. The conidia are then dispersed by wind and rain splash, spreading the fungi to other vines, and from one part of the vine to another. Disease develops when conidia land on freshly cut or damaged wood. The conidia germinate the tissue of the wood and start causing damage to the vascular system. Cankers begin to form around the initial infection point and eventually complete damage of the vascular system causes necrosis and dieback of the wood. In some instances, pseudothecia form on the outside of cankers and produce ascospores which are then dispersed like conidia and infect surrounding wounds.

Management
There are many different procedures that can be implemented to manage dieback in a vineyard. These can either be done to prevent further infection by breaking the disease cycle  or to recover plants after initial infection. Good hygiene must be practiced when removing infection sources in order to prevent further infection to the rest of the vineyard as well as to avoid cross contamination. Strategies that can be used for prevention and recovery are listed in the table below:

References

External links
 USDA ARS Fungal Database
 

Botryosphaeriaceae
Fungal tree pathogens and diseases
Cacao diseases
Fungal citrus diseases
Grapevine trunk diseases